Mars and Venus Surprised by Vulcan or Venus, Vulcan and Mars is a 1551-1552 oil on canvas painting by Jacopo Tintoretto, now in the Alte Pinakothek in Munich.

The painting depicts a scene of extra-marital sex. The goddess Venus is lying nude on a couch whilst her lover Mars is hiding helmeted under a bed. Venus' husband Vulcan, tipped off by Apollo, has just returned unexpectedly. Luckily for the adulterous couple he has become distracted by his wife's naked body, disregarding the warnings of his dog. Cupid is sleeping in a cot by the window.

The event was a popular subject during the Renaissance, emphasising the real dangers of adultery, but in this work Tintoretto has introduced an element of comedy. Maybe Venus can distract Vulcan long enough to allow Mars to make a silent getaway.

References

 Article partly based on the equivalent artixle on French Wikipedia

1552 paintings
Paintings by Tintoretto
Collection of the Alte Pinakothek
Paintings of Mars (mythology)
Paintings of Venus
Oil on canvas paintings
Paintings of Vulcan (mythology)